Vasyl Mykhailovych Bilozersky (born 1825, Motronivka, Borzna county; died 4 March 1899, Saint Petersburg) was a Ukrainian political and cultural activist, journalist, scientist, pedagogue. He was a brother of Hanna Barvinok (real name Oleksandra Bilozerska), who was married to Panteleimon Kulish.

After graduating in 1846 from the Kiev University, for couple of years Bilozersky was an instructor at the Peter Cadet Corps school in Poltava. During that period together with Mykola Kostomarov and Mykola Hulak, he became the organizer of one of the first political organization in the Russian Empire, Brotherhood of Saints Cyril and Methodius.

As a member of the brotherhood, Bilozersky participated in creation of Statute of the Slavic Brotherhood of Saints Cyril and Methodius and was the author of the Note which was an explanation to the brotherhood's statute. Bilozersky developed the idea of Christian Socialism and promoted union of all Slavic nations in republican federation where the leading role would have played Ukraine.

In 1847 he was arrested and sent to Olonets Governorate where he worked at the Petrozavodsk Government Administration. In 1856 Bilozersky was freed from his exile and he moved to Saint Petersburg where he joined the local hromada organization. From 1861 to 1862 Bilozersky became the editor of the first Ukrainian monthly magazine in the city Osnova that was published mainly in Ukrainian.

Later he served in Warsaw where Bilozersky kept relations with Galicia and cooperated with magazines Meta and Pravda. The last days of his life he spent in Motronivka.

References

External links 
 Bilozersky at the NANU Institute of History of Ukraine
 Bilozersky at the Internet Encyclopedia of Ukraine

Ukrainian democracy activists
1825 births
1899 deaths
Ukrainian journalists
People from Chernigov Governorate
People from Chernihiv Oblast
Taras Shevchenko National University of Kyiv alumni
Ukrainian people in the Russian Empire
Ukrainian Christian socialists
Brotherhood of Saints Cyril and Methodius members
Hromada (society) members
Ukrainian exiles in the Russian Empire